Salmon 3D is an upcoming Indian Malayalam-language 3D film directed by Shalil Kallur. The film stars playback singer Vijay Yesudas along with Jonita Doda, Rajiv Pillai, and Tanvi Kishore in important characters. The film began principal photography on 23 November 2019, after the first look poster launch, and was shot mainly in Kerala, Dubai and Malaysia.

Plot
Salmon 3D is the story of Sarfarosh, wife Sameera and their daughter Shazaan settled in Dubai. A murder happens at a party that spoils every dream, but a power that knows the truth is the only hope of Sarfarosh.

Cast

Vijay Yesudas
Jonita Doda
Rajeev Pillai
Neha Saxena
Dhruvanth 
Shiyas Kareem
Minakshi Jaiswal
Tanvi Kishore
Basheer Bashi
Shalil Kallur
Anju Nair
Jabir  Muhammed
Shini Ambalathodi
Bismi Navas
Pattalam Sunny
Seethu
Vinu Abraham
Nazreen nazeer
Darshini
Naveen illath
Sangeetha Vipul
Rashid
Jyothi Chandran
Jeremy Jacob
Baby Hena
Alim Ziyan
Baby Devananda
Sumesh mukhathala
Zinaaj
Razak
Francis
Premi Viswanath

Production
Hyderabad based Key Entertainments, ventures into movies with the $150 million production Salmon, and the film shot in 3D is primarily made in 7 Indian regional languages with a host of newcomers and noticed actors. PVR Cinemas has been assigned as the distributor of the film targeting an international release. Shyam Sasidharan, who has worked for Porinju Mariam Jose and Lailaa O Lailaa was signed as the editor with Rahul Menon as the cinematographer. Playback singer Vijay Yesudas, who has played lead roles in Avan, Padaiveeran and negative role in Maari, was signed to play the lead role. Hindi TV actors Basheer Bashi, Shiyas Kareem and Jabir Muhammed were offered important roles. Multi-linguist actress Tanvi Kishore was also signed for the film, that has a total number of 42 songs including all the 7 languages.

A special team of 3D technicians, Jeemon Pullely (3D stereoscopic director) and Vinex Varghese (3D stereoscopic supervisor) was assigned to work in the film with Folea studio Pvt ltd providing the 3D Camera and crew. Folea Film has been assigned as 3D stereoscopic VFX studio, while Shijin Hutton and Abhishek Nair was signed as sound designers with Jeemon K.Paily as stereographer of the film.

Release
The film is planned to release simultaneously in Bengali, Hindi, Kannada, Malayalam, Marathi, Tamil, and Telugu languages.

References

External links
 

Upcoming films
Indian 3D films
Film productions suspended due to the COVID-19 pandemic
Films postponed due to the COVID-19 pandemic